The São Tomé fiscal (Lanius newtoni), or Newton's fiscal,  is a species of bird in the family Laniidae. It is endemic to São Tomé Island, São Tomé and Príncipe. It is 20 to 21 centimeters long. The bird is black above with a white shoulder-scapular bar. The São Tomé fiscal has a pale yellow chin, breast, belly, flanks vent and under tail. Its graduated tail has all black central tail feathers and an increasing amount of white on outer web from inner to outer tail feathers. The Lanius newtoni has a clear voice with a whistle tiuh tiuh often repeated and metallic tsink tsink audible over a long distance.

The species lives on the island of São Tomé and is usually found under closed canopy. Its natural habitats are subtropical or tropical moist lowland forests and subtropical or tropical moist montane forests.

Status
The São Tomé fiscal is a very rare bird. There were records of sightings in 1888 and again in 1928. Another individual was sighted in 1990 near the source of the Rio Xufexufe, and a number of birds have been spotted since then. All sightings have been in primary forest with rocky areas but little undergrowth, sometimes on low ridges or beside watercourses, and always below . This type of habitat is decreasing as forests are cut to create coffee and cocoa plantations, and the building of new hydropower plants are another possible threat, even though it is a protected area (Parque Natural Obô de São Tomé). It is considered to be a critically endangered bird by the International Union for Conservation of Nature.

References

External links
BirdLife Species Factsheet.

Lanius
Endemic birds of São Tomé and Príncipe
Endemic fauna of São Tomé Island
Critically endangered fauna of Africa
Birds described in 1891
Taxonomy articles created by Polbot